The Serie A has 33 teams (1 Liga MX Reserve Team, 5 Liga de Expansión MX Reserve Teams and 27 Serie A Teams) divided into three groups. For the 2022–23 season, it will be a return of two short tournaments consisting of 10 total matches played home & away and the liguilla. The top 2 teams & two 3rd-place teams from each group at the end of each Torneo will play in the Liguilla for a spot to play for promotion to Liga de Expansión MX provided that their stadiums meet the requirements to ascend.

The Serie A was created in the second half of 2008, with the participation and approval of the owners of the teams of the Second and Third Division, being next to Serie B part of the Liga Premier.

As of the 2022–23 Season, Pachuca from Liga MX; Celaya, Correcaminos UAT, Mineros de Zacatecas, Cimarrones de Sonora and Leones Negros all from Liga de Expansión MX will join the Liga Premier to give young players professional experience. However, only Correcaminos UAT, Cimarrones de Sonora, Leones Negros UdeG and Pachuca will have a reserve team, while Celaya and Mineros de Zacatecas will have an associated team that will have its own identity.

Teams for 2022–23 season
The member clubs of the Serie A for the 2022–23 season are listed as follows.

Group 1

Stadium and locations

Group 2

Stadium and locations

Group 3

Stadium and locations

{{Location map+ |Mexico |width=650|float=right |caption=Location of teams in the 2022–23 Serie A Group 3 |places=

Offseason Changes
On May 21, 2022 Aguacateros CDU was promoted from Serie B de México.
On May 25, 2022 UACH F.C. franchise on hiatus was reactivated and renamed Chihuahua F.C.
On May 28,2022 Deportiva Venados was promoted from Liga TDP.
On June 14, 2022 Durango was accepted as a new member of the Liga de Expansión MX after passing the certification process to join the competition, Durango was the champion of the 2021–22 Serie A de México season.
 On June 22, 2022 the Atlético Reynosa franchise was reactivated, the team was relocated to Tampico  and Ciudad Madero and renamed Tampico Madero.
 On July 1, 2022 Los Cabos United, Mexicali, Real de Arteaga and Tulancingo joined the league as expansion teams.
 On July 1, 2022 Pachuca Reserve Team was reactivated after a 4–years hiatus. 
 On July 1, 2022 Cañoneros and Mazorqueros were relocated at Serie B de México.
 On July 14, 2022 Liguilla de Filiales (reserve teams play-off) it was recovered after three years without playing. Six teams have this condition and are not eligible for promotion to Liga de Expansión MX: Cimarrones de Sonora, Leones Negros UdeG, Lobos ULMX, Mineros de Fresnillo, Pachuca and UAT. The best four teams with this condition will play the play-offs.

Clausura Tournament changes
 On January 27, 2023 Catedráticos Elite F.C. was relocated from Ameca, Jalisco to Salamanca, Guanajuato.

References

</noinclude>

 
3
Professional sports leagues in Mexico